Kentucky elected its members August 6, 1810.

See also 
 Kentucky's 5th congressional district special election, 1810
 United States House of Representatives elections, 1810 and 1811
 List of United States representatives from Kentucky

Notes 

1810
Kentucky
United States House of Representatives